UFC Fight Night: Rivera vs. Moraes  (also known as UFC Fight Night 131) was a mixed martial arts event produced by the Ultimate Fighting Championship that was held on June 1, 2018, at Adirondack Bank Center in Utica, New York.

Background
The event marked the promotion's first visit to Utica.

A bantamweight bout between Jimmie Rivera and former WSOF Bantamweight Champion Marlon Moraes served as the event headliner.

Bryan Barberena was expected to face Jake Ellenberger at the event. However, on March 23, Barberena pulled out due to injury. He was replaced by Ben Saunders.

A lightweight bout between The Ultimate Fighter: Brazil 2 welterweight winner Leonardo Santos and Nik Lentz was expected to take place at this event. However, on April 28, it was reported that Santos was pulled from the event due to a hand injury. He was replaced by David Teymur

Niko Price was expected to face Belal Muhammad at the event. However, Price was removed from the bout on May 22 for undisclosed reasons and replaced by promotional newcomer Chance Rencountre.

Hector Sandoval was expected to face Jarred Brooks at the event. However, Sandoval was removed from the bout on May 22 for undisclosed reasons and replaced by promotional newcomer Jose Torres.

Former WSOF Women's Strawweight Champion Jessica Aguilar and Jodie Esquibel were scheduled to face each other in a strawweight bout. Both women successfully weighed in, but the bout was removed from the card the day of the event by the NYSAC due to a concern over a medical issue with Aguilar.

Results

Bonus awards
The following fighters were awarded $50,000 bonuses:
Fight of the Night: None awarded
Performance of the Night: Marlon Moraes, Gregor Gillespie,  Ben Saunders, and Nathaniel Wood

See also
List of UFC events
2018 in UFC
List of current UFC fighters
Mixed martial arts in New York

References

UFC Fight Night
2018 in mixed martial arts
Mixed martial arts in New York (state)
2018 in sports in New York (state)